Peggy Montgomery (1904–1989) was an American actress of the silent era. She frequently played female leads in western films.

Selected filmography
 The Speed Demon (1925)
 The Dangerous Dub (1926)
 Looking for Trouble (1926)
 Prisoners of the Storm (1926)
 The Hollywood Reporter (1926)
 Forest Havoc (1926)
 Two-Gun of the Tumbleweed (1927)
 The Desert of the Lost (1927)
 Sensation Seekers (1927)
 The Sonora Kid (1927)
 Splitting the Breeze (1927)
 Hoof Marks (1927)
 Saddle Mates (1928)
 Arizona Days (1928)
 Silent Trail (1928)
 West of Santa Fe (1928)
 On the Divide (1928)
 Fighters of the Saddle (1929)
 Wyoming Tornado (1929)
 Bad Men's Money (1929)

References

Bibliography
 Munden, Kenneth White. The American Film Institute Catalog of Motion Pictures Produced in the United States, Part 1. University of California Press, 1997.

External links

1904 births
1989 deaths
American film actresses
American silent film actresses
20th-century American actresses
People from Rock Island, Illinois
American women screenwriters
20th-century American women writers
20th-century American screenwriters